Kermadec or de Kermadec may refer to:

Geography
 Kermadec Islands, a subtropical island arc in the South Pacific Ocean northeast of New Zealand
 Kermadec Plate, a long narrow tectonic plate located west of the Kermadec Trench
 Kermadec Trench, one of Earth's deepest oceanic trenches, reaching a depth of 10047 m
 Kermadec-Tonga subduction zone, a convergent plate boundary

People
 Eugène de Kermadec (1899–1976), a French painter
 Jean-Michel Huon de Kermadec (1748–1792), an 18th-century French navigator
 Liliane de Kermadec (born 1928), a French film director and screenwriter

See also
 Kermadecia